The Ima Market (literally, Mothers' Market), also known as the Nupi Keithel or the Khwairamband Keithel, is a market in the middle of Imphal in the Indian state of Manipur. It is the only market in the world run entirely by women. Inside the market, male shopkeepers and vendors are not allowed to sell anything. The Government of Manipur has announced that the male shopkeepers and vendors will be punished if their shops and vendors are found inside the market. It is a commercial center and a popular tourist attraction in the state of Manipur. It was established in the 16th century and hosts around 5,000–6,000 women vendors who sell a variety of products. Products such as vegetables, fruits, textiles, toys, fish, spices and utensils are available in the market. It is the largest all–women market in Asia.

History 

The market was established in the 16th century following the imposition of the labour system, lallup-kaba in 1533 CE. The lallup-kaba was a forced labour system in Manipur Kingdom which required male members of the Meitei ethnicity to work in distant lands or to serve in the army. As a consequence of the system, women had to support their households by cultivating their fields or weaving textiles and then selling the products on improvised markets. The improvised markets led to the formation of the organized Ima Keithel. The Ima Keithel was the primary permanent market in Manipur until the 20th century.

In 1891, the British colonial administration attempted to impose economic and political reform in Manipur Kingdom which disrupted the functioning of the market. The reforms involved large scale seizure and export of food corps from Manipur without consideration for local requirements which caused starvation at times of Mautam. It led to agitations by the women of the Ima Keithel and in response, the British attempted to sell off the assets and properties of Ima Keithel to foreigners and external buyers. This among other causes resulted in the Nupi Lan or the women's war, which eventually seized with the Japanese invasion of India.

Following independence, the market regained prominence as a commercial center and a hub of socio-political discussions. In 2010, the market was moved into the Khawairamband Bazaar complex constructed by the Municipal Corporation of Imphal. The complex had sustained damaged in the 2016 Imphal earthquake which effected the livelihood of around 800 vendors.

Market 
The Ima Keithel is located in the Khawairamband Bazaar Complex reconstructed on the site of Purana Bazaar in central Imphal. It is located west of Kangla Fort and on the Bir Tikendrajit Road in the Thangal Bazar locality. The complex consists of three large buildings with pagoda styled roofs. The market is split into two sections on either side of the road. Two buildings are located to the north of the main road and one to the south. The buildings are segregated into textile housing sections and household groceries sections. There is also a section of stalls under a large tin and tarp arrangement market to the east of the main buildings. In order to set up stalls in the main buildings of the market, an annual municipal fees is levied. The fee of a  stall was ₹140,000 per annum at the time of construction in 2010. There is a licensing system in place for vendors with stalls. The market houses around 5000–6000 women vendors at any given day. As of 2017, the vendors at the market make an annual profit between ₹73,000 and ₹200,000. The annual turnover of the market was estimated to be between ₹40–50Crore.

Management 
The market is managed by a union of all the vendors of the market. It maintains a custom of only allowing women who have been married at least once to set up stalls. The women vendors include those who are divorced or have been widowed in the insurgency in Manipur. The vendors are primarily in the age of 45–70 years. The union also runs a credit system for lending to women traders.

See also 

 Nupi Lan
 Meira Paibi

References 

Meitei architecture
Meitei culture
16th-century establishments in India
Markets in India
Retail markets in India
Bazaars in India
Shopping districts and streets in India
History of Manipur
Organisations based in Manipur
Tourist attractions in Manipur
Imphal